The Chairman of the Legislative Assembly of Yamalo-Nenets Autonomous Okrug is the presiding officer of that legislature.

Chairmen

Sources 
The Legislative Assembly of Yamalo-Nenets

Lists of legislative speakers in Russia
Politics of Yamalo-Nenets Autonomous Okrug